Brother's Keeper is the fifth studio album by the New Orleans band, The Neville Brothers. It was released in 1990 on A&M Records.

The album features background vocals performed by Linda Ronstadt on "Fearless", as well as Buffy Sainte-Marie and Marva Wright on "Sons and Daughters."

Critical reception
Cee Dee of Off Beat Magazine begins the review of Brother's Keeper with, "Set to hit the streets on August 7, The Nevilles’ latest is probably the most-anticipated album in recent New Orleans history. And this album was well worth the wait."

Chris Willman of the LA Times concludes his review with, "the brothers have produced yet another keeper."

Curt Fields has mixed feelings about the album and writes, "To be sure, there are some incandescent moments on Brother's Keeper, but they are fewer in number than the group's fans are accustomed to hearing."

See original reviews for full articles. Links can be found in the references section of this article.

Track listing

Track information and credits verified from the album's liner notes.

Personnel
Aaron Neville – vocals, keyboards, percussion
Art Neville – vocals, keyboards
Cyril Neville – vocals, percussion
Charles Neville – vocals, saxophone, percussion, keyboards
Willie Green – drums
Tony Hall – bass, backing vocals
Eric Struthers – guitar
Leo Nocentelli – guitar
Daryl Johnson – additional bass, guitar, keyboards, backing vocals
Ronald Jones – additional drums
Wally Wilson – keyboards on "Fearless"
Brian Stoltz – acoustic guitar and keyboards on "Fearless"
Bill Dillon – additional guitar on "Fearless"
Daniel Lanois – additional guitar on "Fearless"
Eugene Ross – additional guitar on "Witness"
Herman "Hack" Bartholomew – trumpet, vocals and piano on "Witness"
Renard Poché – trombone and guitar solo on "Brother Jake"
Tim Green – tenor saxophone
Fred Kemp – baritone saxophone
Roger Lewis – baritone saxophone
Reggie Houston – baritone saxophone
Ivan Neville – vocals on "Brother Jake"
Gaynielle Neville – backing vocals on "Brother Blood"
Linda Ronstadt – backing vocals on "Fearless"
Buffy Sainte-Marie – backing vocals on "Sons and Daughters"
Marva Wright – backing vocals on "Sons and Daughters"
Malcolm Burn – additional instruments and backing vocals
Steve Jordan – vocals, additional drums, guitars, additional bass on "River of Life"
Ken "Snakebite" Jacobs – baritone saxophone on "River of Life"
George Sartin – guitar on "River of Life"
Emanuel Steib – trombone on "River of Life"
Charles Brady and Eric Colb – ideas and inspiration on "Sons and Daughters"

Charts

References

1990 albums
A&M Records albums
The Neville Brothers albums